Paolo Angioni (born 22 January 1938) is an Italian former equestrian and Olympic champion. He competed in the mixed three-day eventing, individual and team, at the 1964 and 1968 Olympics and won a team gold medal in 1964. In 1966, Angioni was crushed by his horse at a competition in Poland. He went into a coma, but recovered and continued to compete. In retirement he wrote several books on equestrian history and techniques.

Achievements

References

External links 
 

1938 births
Living people
Olympic equestrians of Italy
Italian male equestrians
Equestrians at the 1964 Summer Olympics
Equestrians at the 1968 Summer Olympics
Olympic gold medalists for Italy
Italian event riders
Olympic medalists in equestrian
Medalists at the 1964 Summer Olympics